Blue Star Mykonos  is a ferry owned by Blue Star Ferries that currently operates most commonly on the Piraeus-Syros-Mykonos-Samos-Chios-Mytilene-Kavala route. It is driven by four Wartsila 12V38 main diesel engines and has an operating speed of 25 knots, making it faster than all other big ferries currently serving the Cyclades Islands and North Aegean. The ferry is a sister ship to Blue Star  Chios.

The ship was ordered by Gerasimos Strintzis in the mid 90's on behalf of "Strintzis Lines" and launched at Hellenic Shipyards Co. originally named Superferry Chios. In the year 2000, and while the construction of the ship was ongoing, Strintzis Lines were sold, and the order cancelled. The ship remained unfinished until 2005. Upon building completion the ship was renamed Nissos Mykonos and was delivered by Gerasimos Strintzis, then chairman and general manager of Hellenic Seaways.

The ship is named after the Greek island of Mykonos.

In January 2020 Nissos Mykonos was renamed Blue Star Myconos.

References

External links

2005 ships
Ferries of Greece
Ships built in Greece
Ships of Blue Star Ferries